Cambaroides dauricus is a species of crayfish endemic to north-eastern China, the Korean Peninsula and neighbouring parts of Russia.

References

Cambaridae
Freshwater crustaceans of Asia
Crustaceans described in 1773
Taxa named by Peter Simon Pallas